Wesley Wilkins (born 15 July 1985) is a former South African rugby union footballer, who regularly played as a flanker.

References

1985 births
Living people
Griquas (rugby union) players
Rugby union flankers
Rugby union players from East London, Eastern Cape
South African people of English descent
South African rugby union players
Stellenbosch University alumni